Talia Airways Flight 2H79 was a passenger flight which crashed into the Kyrenian mountain range on approach to Northern Cyprus on 27 February 1988. All 15 occupants on board the aircraft died in the crash and fire that followed.

Flight and aircraft
The Talia Airways aircraft was on a flight from Istanbul's Atatürk Airport to Ercan International Airport in Northern Cyprus. It was running a near-empty flight to collect 160 passengers to transport them back to Finland. The airframe was a Boeing 727-200 which had been built in 1974. The flight was lightly loaded with thirteen crew and two passengers, all of whom died in the crash. Seven of the crew were Yugoslavian, two of the stewardesses were British, and the rest of the crew were from Turkey. The two passengers were a senior manager at Talia Airways and his wife. The aircraft belonged to a Yugoslavian airline company (JAT), and was on hire to Talia Airways.

Accident
When the pilot saw the peak in front of him he tried to turn left, but the aircraft crashed into the mountain with the rear of the plane being wrecked on the northern side of the mountain, and the forward part being wrecked on the southern side. The aircraft crashed at 10:20 am (local time), barely ten minutes before it was due to land.

When the rescue services arrived on the scene, they noted wreckage strewn over large area and charred bodies. Sources vary on the breakdown of the occupants on board, however, it is agreed that 15 people died, all of whom were on the aircraft. No one on the ground was injured or died. The bodies of the stewardesses were so badly charred that identification was very difficult, and resulted in the wrong bodies being sent to the families.

A five-member team from the Turkish Transport Ministry flew to Northern Cyprus the day after the crash to investigate.

Aftermath

A separate inquiry was held into the death of the two British personnel, in June 1988. Much of the wreckage was left at the crash site, and still lies there in the 21st century.

References
 

Aviation accidents and incidents in 1988
Aviation accidents and incidents in Cyprus
Airliner accidents and incidents involving controlled flight into terrain
1988 in Cyprus
February 1988 events
Accidents and incidents involving the Boeing 727
1988 disasters in Cyprus